104.1 Territory FM is a community radio station based in Darwin, Australia. Territory FM broadcasts a broad range of adult contemporary music from the Casuarina campus of Charles Darwin University. News is provided by Nine News between 6:00am and 10:00pm. Territory FM also has a long-standing media agreement with the Nine Network, broadcasting Nine News Darwin bulletins every weeknight, as well as updates from their newsroom in the afternoons and weekend sport wraps.

The station is broadcast on 104.1 FM in Darwin, Palmerston, and the surrounding areas. In 2004 to 2008 it could also be heard across the Northern Territory in Batchelor, Katherine, Tennant Creek, Nhulunbuy and Adelaide River.

In 2016 the book Blazing A Trail On Darwin Airwaves – the first 35 years of FM 104.1 Darwin (1981-2016) was released, which documents Darwin's first community radio station and its history. Its introduction was written by long term staff member Jih Seymour.The book can be downloaded here (https://www.newmedia.com.au/wp-content/uploads/35th-Blazin-TopFM-to-TerritoryFM.pdf).

In 2019 Territory FM was added to the DAB services for Darwin and Palmerston. This service is a simulcast of its FM programming.

Listenership

A 2008 survey commissioned by Roy Morgan Research showed that 23% of Darwin and Palmerston residents listen to Territory FM. Territory FM is the most listened-to station in Darwin between 12:00pm and 6:00pm with 27% of Territory FM listeners aged between 35 and 54 years of age.

A 2016 survey commissioned by Roy Morgan showed that Territory FM had a reach of 51% all people and is Darwin's most listened to radio stations, especially during the morning and afternoon timeslots. Weekend listening is extremely strong with programs such as the Acoustic Storm, Alice Cooper, Cultural Village and Saturday Night Rock.

References

External links
Official website

Radio stations in Darwin, Northern Territory
Student radio stations in Australia
Charles Darwin University